Andrew Vincent Stoltenberg (January 26, 1865 – December 25, 1921) was a United States Navy sailor and a recipient of the Medal of Honor for his actions in the Philippine–American War.

Biography
Andrew Vincent Stoltenberg was born in Aarnes, Trondenes, Norway. His father died when he was 4 years old and he was raised by an aunt and uncle.  He left home as a young man and went to sea, arriving in the United States in 1882. In August 1890 he joined the United States Navy in San Francisco, California. He retired from the United States Navy after 30 years with the rate of Chief Gunner's Mate. He is buried in San Francisco National Cemetery.

Medal of Honor citation
As a Gunner's Mate Second Class, Stoltenberg received the Medal "for distinguished conduct in the presence of the enemy in battle" at Catbalogan, Samar, Philippines, on July 16, 1900. 
Rank and organization: Gunner's Mate Second Class, U.S. Navy. Born: Boto, Norway. Accredited to: California. G.O. No.: 55, July 29, 1899.

Citation: 
For distinguished conduct in the presence of the enemy in battle at Katbalogan, Samar, Philippine Islands, July 16, 1900.

See also

List of Philippine–American War Medal of Honor recipients

Notes

1865 births
1921 deaths
People from Harstad
Norwegian emigrants to the United States
United States Navy Medal of Honor recipients
American military personnel of the Philippine–American War
United States Navy sailors
Norwegian-born Medal of Honor recipients
Philippine–American War recipients of the Medal of Honor
Burials at San Francisco National Cemetery